In the ancient Punjab region, people wore cotton clothing. Both men and women wore knee-length tops. A scarf was worn over the tops which would be draped over the left shoulder and under the right. A large sheet would be further draped over one shoulder which would hang loose towards the knees. Both male and female wore a dhoti around the waist. Modern Punjabi dress has retained this outfit but over its long history has added other forms of dress.

The Punjab region had a flourishing industry in cotton during the 19th and early 20th centuries, when various kinds of coarse cotton cloths including  were manufactured in Hoshiarpur, Gurdaspur, Peshawar, Lahore, Multan, Amritsar, Ludhiana, Jhang, Shahpur, Jalandhar, Delhi, Gurgaon, Rohtak, Karnal, Rewari, Panipat etc. This cotton industry added to the richness of Punjabi clothing which exhibits Punjab's rich and vibrant culture in its dresses. Various types of dresses are worn based on different Punjabi festivals, local events and ceremonies. 

Along with different traditional dresses special types of ornaments are also very common.

Suthan

The use of the suthan in the Punjab region also called suthana in Punjabi is a survival of the ancient svasthana.  Svasthana referred to a lower garment which can be described as a type of trousers.  The svasthana was in use amongst the rulers in the Mauryan times(322–185 BCE), amongst the ruling classes in North India during the Kushan Empire between the 1st and 3rd centuries C.E, during the Gupta Empire between 4th and 6th centuries C.E. and during King Harsha's rule during the 7th century C.E.

The Punjabi suthan is a direct variation of the svasthana which can either be loose to above the ankles and tight around the ankles, or loose to the knees and tight to the ankles. The suthan is a male and female garment but its use is particularly important in the Punjabi suthan suit whereby it is worn by women with a kurti or kurta. It is also a part of the Punjabi ghagra outfit. Other variations include the choga (robe) and suthan combination.

Kurta

The kurta with its side slits in the Punjabi kurta can be traced to the 11th century C.E. female kurtaka worn in parts of north India. The kurtaka was a short shirt, with sleeves extending from the shoulders, to the middle of the body, and had slashes on the left and the right sides. This is the same as the modern Punjabi kurta which has side slits and is worn by women in the Punjab region as do men. The kurta also draws inspiration from the jama and the Punjabi angarkha.

Phulkari sari
The Phulkari sari is the most loved sari that is available in Punjab. In Punjabi, the word 'phulkari' signifies floral designs. The sari derives its name from the unique floral motifs that are used to decorate the sari.

Multani kurta
The Multani kurta is crocheted using designs of Multan (Punjab, Pakistan). Local Ajrak prints are also used.

Punjabi phulkari kurta
A Phulkari kurta is embroidered using the Phulkari embroidery of the Punjab region.

Punjabi bandhani kurta
Bandhani tye-dyeing is popular in the Cholistan desert area of the Punjab region. Bandhani patterns are used on kurtas.

Muktsari kurta
The traditional Punjabi kurta of the Punjab region is wide and falls to the knees and is cut straight. The modern version of the regional kurta is the Mukatsari kurta which originates from Muktsar in Punjab, India. This modern Punjabi kurta is famous for its slim fitting cuts and smart fit designs. It is very popular among young politicians.

Salwar Kameez
 
The Salwar is the traditional dress of women in the Punjab region. It is made up of a kurta or kameez and a straight cut salwar. In some parts of the Punjab region, men also wear the Punjabi suit.

The Punjabi suit is cut differently to the styles worn in Balochistan and Afghanistan and is known as a "Punjabi suit" with the kameez being cut straight and flat with side slits (which is a local development as earlier forms of kameez did not have side slits/it's a remnant of the varbana).  The salwar is wide at the top but fits closely to the legs and is gathered at the ankles. The Punjabi salwar is also cut straight and gathered at the ankles with a loose band reinforced with coarse material. In rural Punjab, the salwar is still called the suthan. The Punjabi suit is popular in other regions of the subcontinent, such as Mumbai and Sindh. It is also popular in Afghanistan, where it is called the Punjabi.

Punjabi tamba and kurta

Kurti

In modern usage, a short kurta is referred to as the kurti. However, traditionally, the kurti refers to upper garments which sit above the waist without side slits, and are believed to have descended from the tunic of the Shunga period (2nd century B.C.).

In the Punjab region, the kurti is a short cotton coat. Another style of Punjabi kurti is a short version of the anga (robe). The kurti can be worn by men but women wear it along with the Punjabi ghagra or suthan.

Pothohari suit
Another style of the Punjabi suit is the use of the salwar which hails from the Pothohar region of Northern Punjab and is known as the Pothohari salwar. The Pothohari salwar retains the wideness of the older Punjabi suthan and also has some folds. The kameez is also wide. The head scarf is traditionally large, similar to the chador or Phulkari that was used throughout the plains of the Punjab region.

Chola

The chola is a long outfit which is similar to a gown. It is worn by women and men and can reach the ankles, or fall just below the knees. The traditional chola is closed by loops and is tied on either shoulder and tends not to have side slits. The chola is the traditional alternative to other upper garments of the local region. The modern chola opens at the front below the neck, is closed with buttons and may have side slits, and is worn like a kurta. In Himachal Pradesh, the woolen waist band is called a dora.

Choga
A choga is a long sleeved, skirted cloak that opens to the down front and is fastened above the waist.

Punjabi suthan suit

The Punjabi suthan and kurta/kurti suit is an outfit with a very long history. The Punjabi suthan is a local variation of the ancient svasthana tight fitting trousers which have been used in the Punjab region since the ancient period and was worn with the tunic called varbana which was tight fitting.

The Punjabi suthan is arranged in plaits and uses large amounts of material (traditionally coloured cotton with vertical silk lines, called sussi) of up to 20 yards hanging in innumerable folds. The suthan ends at the ankles with a tight band which distinguishes the suthan from a salwar. Some versions of the Punjabi suthan tighten from the knees down to the ankles (a remnant of the svasthana). If a tight band is not used, the ends of the suthan fit closely around the ankles. The head scarf can be a wide chador, phulkari or modern dupatta/chunni.

Punjabi ghagra

The Punjabi ghagra was the traditional apparel for women before the advent of the Punjabi suit. It is still worn in parts of the Punjab region and the outfit comprises the head scarf, kurta/kurti, suthan/salwar and the ghagra.

The ghagra has its origin in the candataka, which had become a popular garment in the Gupta period. The candataka was a men's half trousers which eventually developed into the ghagra. The intermediate formation has been described as a shirt like dress for men and women from the neck to the thighs. Candataka continued as a popular female dress in the seventh century.

Punjabi Juti

The Punjabi Jutti is the Punjabi version of the shoe. Local styles include designs from Patiala, the Pothohari shoe with sharp pointed toes, and the Derawali shoe with silk embroidery and round tipped.

Patiala salwar

The Patiala salwar was developed in Patiala and is very popular with women.

Saraiki shalwar suits

Saraiki shalwar suits are Punjabi outfits which include the Bahawalpuri shalwar suit and the Multani shalwar suit. For Suit DIKSHA'S SUITS

Bahawalpuri shalwar suit
The Bahawalpuri shalwar originates from the Bahawalpur region of Punjab, Pakistan. The Bahawalpuri shalwar is very wide and baggy with many voluminous folds. The material traditionally used for the Bahawalpuri shalwar and suthan is known as Sufi which is a mixture of cotton warp mixed with silk weft and gold threads running down the material. The other name for these types of mixed cloth is shuja khani. The Bahawalpuri shalwar is worn with the Bahawalpur style kameez, the Punjabi kurta or chola.

Multani shalwar suit
The Multani shalwar, also known as the 'ghaire wali' or 'Saraiki ghaire wali' shalwar as it is very wide around the waist, originates from the Multan area of the Punjab region. The style is similar to the Sindhi kancha shalwar as both are derivatives of the pantaloon shalwar worn in Iraq and adopted in these locations during the 7th century A.D. The Multani shalwar is very wide, baggy, full and has folds like the Punjabi suthan. The upper garments include the Punjabi kameez and the chola of the Punjab region.

Fabric prints and embroidery
Block printing on cotton and other materials is popular in Multan which utilises local Ajrak prints. The other type of prints are known as chit Multani or Multani chint. 
Cholistan, Bahawalpur and Multan are known for its tie-dying material which is popular in this region. 

The embroidery styles of the Punjab region include the styles of Multani embroidery which features kalabatun  patterns using thin wires. This type of embroidery is also common in the rest of the Punjab region. Kalabatan surkh involves using gold wires on orange coloured and red silk. Kalabatan safed involves using silver wires on white material. There are two kinds of gold embroidery, one of a solid and rich kind called kar-chob and the other called tila-kar or kar-chikan utilising gold thread. The former is used for carpets and saddle cloths whereas the latter is used for dresses. The Punjab region also uses mukesh embroidery: mukesh bati-hui, twisted tinsel, flattened gold wire for embroidery of a heavy kind, and waved mukesh, made by crimping mukesh batihui with iron tongs. 

Kangra is known for the patterns embroidered on its handkerchiefs known as Kangra rumal. The designs include representations of religious stories. These rumals are also embroidered in Chamba.

Phulkari

The Phulkari is the traditional Punjabi embroidery used to embroider shawls and head scarfs in the Punjab region.

Chaup and subar
The  is embroidered on both sides of the cloth. Only the borders and the four edges of the cloth are embroidered in fine embroidery. The subar has a central motif and four motifs on the corners.

Til patra
The til (sesame) patra has decorative embroidery which is spread out as if spreading sesame seeds. The term til patra means 'the sprinkling of seeds'.

Neelak
The  is made of a black or red background with yellow or bright red embroidery. The colour of the phulkari is mixed with metals.

Ghoonghat bagh
Originating in Rawalpindi, the ghoonghat bagh is heavily embroidered around the centre on the edge to be worn over the head. The embroidered centre is then pulled over the face so as to form an embroidered veil.

Chhamaas
The chhaamas phulkari hails from Rohtak, Gurgaon, Hissar and Delhi. The  incorporates mirrors which are sewn into the cloth with yellow, grey or blue thread.

Phulkari of south and southwestern Punjab region
The phulkari of south and southwestern Punjab region, has wide edges upon which designs of animals and birds are embroidered. South and southwestern Punjab region includes the south Punjab, India, south and south west of Punjab, Pakistan.

Senchi phulkari
The senchi phulkari is popular in and around Ferozepur. The  incorporates designs of birds, jewellery such as bracelets, earrings, rings and necklaces.

Luanchari
Luanchari is a full-dress made of two parts stitched together: the upper part is the choli and the lower is the lehanga. It is traditional garment worn by Gaddis of Himachal Pradesh.

Punjabi ghuttana
The Punjabi ghuttana was popular with women and men in the Punjab region, a type of pajama which is shorter than the full length pajama, and is tight and ends at the calf. Its variation is still worn in Jammu.

Churidar pajama
The use of the churidar is traditionally associated with the northern regions of the sub-continent. Although there is no consensus as to its origins, the churidar pajama was adopted by the former princely families.  In the Punjab region however, its use was amongst the general population.

For people of the Punjab region, the churidar pajama which forms part of the traditional attire of men and women in Punjab is a combination of the tight suthan of the Punjab region, the churidar suthan of the Punjab's hill area, and the traditional Dogri suthan which ends in loose bangles (and is more of a loose pajama as the suthan has to have a tight band at the ankles). Accordingly, the churidar pajama is believed to be derived from the suthan. The Churidar is popular all over the sub-continent and was developed in the Punjab region, and is associated with the Punjab. The churidar pajama can be of any colour but traditionally is of sussi (cotton) material, in blue with vertical stripes.

The churidar pajama is also known as the (full length) ghuttana. When soldiers from Lucknow travelled to the British Punjab province, they saw the long ghuttana pajama and adopted its use in Lucknow during the 19th century.

Jama

The jama was worn by men in the Punjab region during the Mughal period. The phrase "jora jama" refers to the clothes given by the maternal uncle to the groom, which points to the jama being part of Punjabi clothing (although grooms do not wear the jama now). A local style of shawl called the jamawar which was striped was used as a gown.

Anga/Angarkha

The anga (robe) also known as an angarkha and peshwaj) is similar to a loose coat and wadded with cotton. The anga can be worn by men and women. When worn by men, it falls to below the knees, is a loose tunic and is fastened either to the right of the left. An angarkha typically does not have front buttons. Grooms traditionally wore the angarkha which has now been superseded by the achkan. The anga worn by women is a long robe.

Chamba angarkhi
The Chamba angarkhi of Himachal Pradesh is sewen tight at the torso, but below the waist it has an open fall like the modern skirt. The angarkhi is tied at the waist with a sash.

Turban

Men traditionally wear the turban. In the past, large turbans were worn such as the type in Bahawalpur which could be up to 40 feet long. Now the turbans are shorter of various designs.

Khes

Khes is a stout damask cloth used for winter wraps, generally weaved with coarse yarns made of cotton. It is a simple clothing item to wear loosely. Khes is a comfort object used in bedding and also as like a shawl- wrap by men in Punjab, India, and Pakistan to cover upper body parts.  Khes was an important cloth of Punjab province.

Paranda

Paranda or parandi is hair accessory worn by women in Punjab.

Saluka
The  is a tight fitting waistcoat which was worn in Sindh and the Punjab region. It is also worn in Uttar Pradesh.

See also
 Saraiki shalwar suits
 Sindhi dress
 Jammu dress
 Perahan tunban
 Firaq partug
 Khet partug
 Phiran
 Pakistani clothing
 Clothing of Balochistan, Pakistan
 Khyber Pakhtunkhwa clothing
Khes

References

Punjabi clothing
Folk costumes
Pakistani clothing by ethnicity
Indian clothing